John Millington may refer to:
John Millington (professor) (1779–1868), professor of mechanics at the Royal Institution, 1817–1829
John Millington (rugby league) (born 1949), English rugby league footballer who played in the 1970s and 1980s
John Millington Synge

See also 

 John Billington (disambiguation)
 Millington